The 2007 Bauchi State gubernatorial election was the 6th gubernatorial election of Bauchi State. Held on April 14, 2011, the All Nigeria Peoples Party nominee Isa Yuguda won the election, defeating Mohammed Nadada Umar of the People's Democratic Party.

Results 
A total of 9 candidates contested in the election. Isa Yuguda from the All Nigeria Peoples Party won the election, defeating Mohammed Nadada Umar from the People's Democratic Party. Registered voters was 2,211,463.

References 

Bauchi State gubernatorial elections
Bauchi gubernatorial
Bauchi State gubernatorial election